Ali Düşenkalkar (born 1961) is a Turkish Cypriot actor based in Turkey.

Biography
Ali Düşenkalkar graduated in theatre from Mimar Sinan University State Conservatory in 1983, following which he joined the  İstanbul State Theatre. Düşenkalkar has acted in, and directed over 40 plays as well as appeared in several films and TV series, notably Reha Erdem's films Kaç Para Kaç and Korkuyorum Anne, Gani Müjde's film Osmanlı Cumhuriyeti, Tolga Örnek's film Devrim Arabaları and the TV adaptation of  Orhan Kemal's novel Hanımın Çiftliği. He won several awards for his performance in Korkuyorum Anne  including 'Best Actor' awards at the 16th Ankara Film Festival and the 14th Sadri Alışık Awards.

His younger sister is the actress Munis Düşenkalkar.

Filmography

References

External links
 

1961 births
People from North Nicosia
Living people
Turkish Cypriot actors
Turkish male film actors
Turkish male stage actors
Turkish male television actors
Cypriot male film actors
20th-century Cypriot male actors
20th-century Turkish male actors
21st-century Turkish male actors
Cypriot male television actors
Cypriot male stage actors